Haruo Wada (15 March 1919 – 17 October 1999) was a Japanese trade unionist and politician.

Wada joined the Japanese Merchant Navy in 1939.  He was a founding member of the All-Japan Seamen's Union in 1945. Starting in 1948, he worked full-time for the union as an organizer.  In 1950, he was a founding member of the General Council of Trade Unions of Japan, and worked for it as a permanent secretary.  He was opposed to its increasingly left-wing stance.  In 1954, he helped found the All-Japan Trade Union Congress (Zenro) split, and was appointed as its general secretary.  In 1964, Zenro became part of the Japanese Confederation of Labour, and he became its vice president.  In 1965, he additionally served as president of the ICFTU Asia and Pacific Regional Organisation, and served until his resignation in 1968.

Wada was a member of the Democratic Socialist Party, and in 1969 he was elected to the House of Representatives, serving until 1972.  From 1974 until 1979, he served in the House of Councillors.

References

1919 births
1999 deaths
Democratic Socialist Party (Japan) politicians
Japanese trade union leaders
Members of the House of Councillors (Japan)
Members of the House of Representatives (Japan)